A longship is a Nordic sea-going ship of the Viking Age.

Longship or long ship or variant, may also refer to:

Places
 Longships, Cornwall, Land's End, Cornwall, England, UK; rocks off the coast

Entertainment
 "The Longships" (song), 1988 song by Enya
 The Long Ships (1941 novel) adventure novel by Frans G. Bengtsson
 The Long Ships (film), 1964 film based on the 1941 novel

Carbon capture and storage
 Longship, a Norwegian carbon capture and storage project

See also

 List of longest ships
Longboat (disambiguation)